Y14 may refer to:
 GER Class Y14, a class of 0-6-0 steam locomotive
 Y14 (gene) or RBM8A, a gene encoding the RNA-binding protein 8A in humans